Teriomima puella, the sweetheart buff, is a butterfly in the family Lycaenidae. It is found in Tanzania (the south-east and from the north-east to Morogoro), Malawi, Zambia and Mozambique. The habitat consists of heavily wooded areas, riverine vegetation and open forests at altitudes ranging from sea level to 1,000 metres.

The larvae feed on tree algae (cyanobacteria) growing on trees.

References

Butterflies described in 1887
Poritiinae
Butterflies of Africa
Taxa named by William Forsell Kirby